Love Broke Thru is the title of the second solo album by Phil Keaggy released in 1977, on New Song Productions.

This album was listed as No. 64 in the 2001 book, CCM Presents: The 100 Greatest Albums in Christian Music.

Track listing

Side one
 "Your Love Broke Through"  – 3:31  (Keith Green, Todd Fishkind, Randy Stonehill)
 "Take Me Closer"  – 4:56  (Keaggy)
 "As the Ruin Falls"   – 4:32  (Keaggy, words from poem by C.S. Lewis)
 "Wild Horse"  – 4:16  (Keaggy)
 "Disappointment"   – 2:38  (Keaggy, words from poem by Edith Lillian Young)

Side two
 "Time" – 6:47  (Keaggy)
 "Portrait"  – 2:04  (Keaggy; words from poem by Beatrice Clelland)
 "Just the Same"  – 3:43  (Keaggy, Buck Herring)
 "Things I Will Do" – 3:15  (Keaggy)
 "Abraham" – 3:33  (Keaggy, Annie Herring, B.Herring)

Personnel
 Leland Sklar: Bass
 Jim Gordon: Drums
 Larry Knechtel: Piano, Fender Rhodes, Organ
 Phil Keaggy: All guitars, vocals
 Michael Omartian: Aarpvark
 Don Menza: Flute
 Marshall Cyr & Bill Baker: Horns
 Mylon LeFevre, Matthew Ward, Anne Herring: Background vocals
 Keaggy, Hopper, Herring: Percussion
 Michael Omartian: String Arrangements
 George Poole: String Contractor

Production notes
 Produced and engineered by Buck Herring
 Executive producer: Scott Ross
 Recorded at Sunwest Studios, Hollywood, CA and Frog Shoes, Burbank, CA

1976 albums
Phil Keaggy albums